Points West may refer to:

 BBC Points West, the BBC's regional TV news programme for the West of England
 Points West (film), a 1929 silent film western